That's Why I Sing This Way is the fourth studio album by American country music singer Daryle Singletary. It was released on April 23, 2002 via Koch Records. Except for its title track, the album is composed of cover songs. Two singles were released from it: the title track and a cover of Conway Twitty's 1980 Number One single "I'd Love to Lay You Down", which respectively reached #47 and #43 on the U.S. Billboard country singles charts. The version of "I Never Go Around Mirrors" on this album was first recorded by Keith Whitley, Whitley had Shafer write the second verse heard here. The album includes guest appearances from George Jones, Dwight Yoakam, Rhonda Vincent, John Wesley Ryles, Merle Haggard and Johnny Paycheck.

Track listing

Personnel
 Joe Caverlee - fiddle, mandolin
 Gregory Cole - background vocals
 Merle Haggard - vocals on "Makeup and Faded Blue Jeans"
 George Jones - vocals on "Walk Through This World with Me"
 Paul Leim - drums
 Terry McMillan - harmonica
 Brent Mason - electric guitar
 Mike Johnson - pedal steel guitar
 Danny Parks - acoustic guitar, electric guitar
 Johnny Paycheck - vocals on "Old Violin"
 John Wesley Ryles - vocals on "Kay"
 Daryle Singletary - lead vocals
 Catherine Styron - piano
 Darrin Vincent - background vocals
 Rhonda Vincent - vocals on "After the Fire Is Gone"
 Glenn Worf - bass guitar
 Dwight Yoakam - vocals on "Love's Gonna Live Here"

Chart performance

References

Allmusic

2003 albums
Covers albums
E1 Music albums
Daryle Singletary albums